Jeannette Rankin is a bronze sculpture depicting the American politician and women's rights advocate of the same name by Terry Mimnaugh, installed in the United States Capitol Visitor Center's Emancipation Hall, in Washington, D.C., as part of the National Statuary Hall Collection. The statue was gifted by the U.S. state of Montana in 1985.

See also
 1985 in art

References

External links

 

1985 establishments in Washington, D.C.
1985 sculptures
Bronze sculptures in Washington, D.C.
Monuments and memorials in Washington, D.C.
Monuments and memorials to women
Rankin
Sculptures of women in Washington, D.C.
Jeannette Rankin